Coatzacoalcos is a major port city in the southern part of the Mexican state of Veracruz, mostly on the western side of the Coatzacoalcos River estuary, on the Bay of Campeche, on the southern Gulf of Mexico coast. The city serves as the municipal seat of the municipality of the same name. It is the state's third largest city, after the city of Veracruz and Xalapa.

Etymology
Coatzacoalcos comes from a Nahuatl word meaning "site of the Snake" or "where the snake hides." According to the legend, this is where the god Quetzalcoatl made his final journey to the sea in around 999 and he made his promise to return.

History

Coatzacoalcos sits within the Olmec heartland. Excavations in 2008 for a tunnel under the Coatzacoalcos River indicate a substantial pre-Hispanic population. 
By the time of the Spanish arrival the area was under Mayan influence. In 1522, Hernán Cortés ordered Gonzalo de Sandoval to fund a settlement near Guazacualco. Sandoval named it Villa del Espíritu Santo.

San Martín Tuxtla is an active volcano lying northwest of Coatzcoalcos in the Sierra de los Tuxtlas. It erupted in 1664, in May 1793 with large ash falls and lava flows, and most recently in 1796.

The town was elevated to the category of port in 1825 and the name was changed to Coatzacoalcos.

The municipality of Coatzacoalcos was established 22 December 1881, with the town as its seat. In 1900 the town name was changed to Puerto México. In 1911 it was elevated to city, and in 1936 the name was changed to the current Coatzacoalcos.

On 23 July 1940, Coatzacoalcos welcomed refugees from the Spanish Civil War who sought asylum in Mexico after travelling across the Atlantic aboard the SS Santo Domingo.

In 1959, the city suffered damage from an  6.4 earthquake.

Coatzacoalcos became a very important crossroads during the oil boom of the 1970s, connecting the Yucatán Peninsula and oil fields in Campeche to the rest of Mexico and to the port of Salina Cruz in Oaxaca on the Pacific coast.

Geography and climate
The city is located at  where the Coatzacoalcos River debouches into the Bay of Campeche. This location has prompted plans for an interoceanic waterway across the Isthmus of Tehuantepec, or for a much expanded railroad system, for over a century.

The city had a 2005 census population of 234,174, making it the third-largest city in the state after Veracruz and Xalapa, but first in metropolitan population. The municipality population in 2010 was 305,260 an increase of 9% over 2005. The largest community in the municipality, aside from the city of Coatzacoalcos, is the town of Allende, with a population of 20,501 in 2005.

In the Köppen climate classification the climate is classified as Am for a tropical monsoon climate. Lying on the Gulf of Mexico, Coatzacoalcos has been struck by several hurricanes and tropical storms such as Hurricane Diana in August 1990, Hurricane Mitch in November 1998, Tropical Storm Larry in October 2003, Hurricane Stan in October 2005, Hurricane Dean in August 2007, Tropical Storm Marco in October 2008, Tropical Storm Hermine in early September 2010, Hurricane Karl in mid September 2010, Tropical Storm Matthew in late September 2010, Hurricane Richard in October 2010 and Hurricane Agatha in late May 2022. The winter months are cooler and drier than the summer months. Occasionally, cold high pressure cells from North America drift south across the Gulf of Mexico and drive strong Tehuano winds across the Isthmus, with very strong wind concentration taking place in Chivela Pass in Oaxaca.

Economy
The city's industry is dominated by the petrochemical sector. Four big industrial petrochemical complexes are located near the city (Pajaritos, Cosoleacaque, Morelos and Cangrejera) making it one of the most important concentrations of its kind in the world. The state-owned Pemex Petroquímica subsidiary is headquartered in Coatzacoalcos and 85% of its production is concentrated there.

Education 
The Universidad Veracruzana maintains a branch campus and library in Coatzacoalcos. Also, TecNM has a campus in the city.

Sports 
The Tiburones Rojos de Coatzacoalcos (Red Sharks) played in the Primera División A until December 2008 when they moved to Orizaba to become part of a reformed Albinegros de Orizaba. The Delfines de Coatzacoalcos (Dolphins) play in the Estadio Rafael Hernández Ochoa, which was built in 1980. The Universidad Istmo Americana F.C. plays in the Tercera División de México and is based in Coatzacoalcos.

Transportation 
Coatzacoalcos has been a transportation hub for hundreds of years. It is connected via air, water, road, and rail to
the surrounding region and the rest of the world.

international airport since August 2006.

The Port of Coatzacoalcos (Puerto México) is an international port of entry that provides transhipment of oil and petrochemicals.
After an upgrade to the railway along the Tehuantepec Route was opened in 1907 by Porfirio Díaz the port saw an increase of shipping via the Isthmus of Tehuantepec, particularly from the American-Hawaiian Steamship Company. The port saw a decrease in traffic after the opening of the Panama Canal from 1914 on, but traffic has started to build up since the oil boom of the 1970s. The railway is now known as the Ferrocarril Transístmico ("Trans-Isthmic Railroad").

The CG Railway operates train ferries between the Port of Coatzacoalcos and the Port of Mobile in Alabama, US. Ferrosur also provides rail service in and out of Coatzacoalcos as far southeast as Las Choapas, to the north and west to Veracruz and Mexico City, as well as to the south over the Tehuantepec route now owned by Ferrocarril Transístmico from Medias Aguas to Salina Cruz in the state of Oaxaca.

Mexican Federal Highway 180 follows the southern shore of the Bay of Campeche through Coatzacoalcos to the Yucatán Peninsula. Highway 180 and a rail line to Allende have been carried over the Coatzacoalcos River via the 1910 built Coatza I bridge for more than a century. A second cable stayed bridge known as Coatza II or Antonio Dovalí Jaime was built to the south to carry more road traffic over the river. It was constructed starting in 1979 and was opened by President Miguel de la Madrid Hurtado on 17 October 1984. A ferry operates between the city of Coatzacoalcos and Allende, which in 2017 was supplemented by a  underwater tunnel that carries four lanes of traffic.

Notable people 
Coatzacoalcos is the birthplace of actress Salma Hayek; journalist María Antonieta Collins; and footballers Sergio Ramirez, who played for FC Ararat Yerevan, in the Armenian Premier League and José Arturo Rivas, who plays for the Tigres de la UANL, in the Primera División de México. Also, Silviano Delgado Valladolid, who was part of Mexico's National Squad during Barcelona 1992 Olympic Games and played for Toluca F.C., Puebla F.C., Morelia F.C.

Twin towns – sister cities
 Rizhao, China
 San Fernando, Philippines

See also

 CG Railway
 German night fighter direction vessel Togo

References

Sources
 Link to tables of population data from Census of 2005 INEGI: Instituto Nacional de Estadística, Geografía e Informática
 Veracruz Enciclopedia de los Municipios de México

External links

 Coatzacoalcos municipal government Official website (in Spanish)
  Municipal Official Information
 The Society of Coatzacoalcos
 Videos of Coatzacoalcos

Populated places in Veracruz
Cities in Mexico
Port cities and towns of the Mexican Gulf Coast
Ports of the Gulf of Mexico
Populated places established in 1522
1522 establishments in New Spain
1520s establishments in Mexico